The Soap Opera Digest Award for Hottest Female Star has been given every year  since the 9th Soap Opera Digest Award in 1993 until 1999.

In the lists below, the winner of the award for each year is shown first, followed by the other nominees.

Recipients

Total awards won

References

Soap Opera Digest Awards